James Raymond Devlin (August 25, 1922 – January 15, 2004) was a Major League Baseball catcher from Plains, Pennsylvania who played for one season. He played for the Cleveland Indians for one game on April 27, 1944. He died in Danville, Pennsylvania.

External links

1922 births
2004 deaths
Cleveland Indians players
St. Jean Braves players
Major League Baseball catchers
Baseball players from Pennsylvania